The Volvo B8R is a 7.7-litre engined coach and intercity bus chassis manufactured by Volvo since 2013 for Euro VI markets. It was designed as a replacement for the B7R and the B9R.

In 2017, Euro III and V versions were launched worldwide with engine outputs at 250 and 330 hp. The 250-hp version is marketed in Brazil as the Volvo B250R.

Throughout Europe the B8R is most commonly available as the Volvo 8900, but can also be found in the Volvo 9500 and some versions of Volvo 9700, and from independent bus builders.

It is also available as a low-entry bus chassis, known as Volvo B8RLE.

In the Philippines, Volvo Buses launched the B8R in August 2018. It is the first B8R in the Philippine market to be imported from Borås, Sweden. The locally-assembled B8R (for both automatic and manual transmission variants) bus chassis kits in Subic at the Autodelta plant from the third quarter of 2019.

Powertrain

Engines
D8K, 7698 cc, in-line 6 cyl. turbodiesel (2013-present)
 D8K280 - 206 kW (280 bhp), 1050 Nm, Euro VI
 D8K320 - 235 kW (320 bhp), 1200 Nm, Euro VI
 D8K350 - 258 kW (350 bhp), 1400 Nm, Euro VI

D8C, 7698 cc, in-line 6 cyl. turbodiesel (2017-present)
 D8C250 - 186 kW (250 bhp), 950 Nm, Euro III/Euro V
 D8C330 - 246 kW (330 bhp), 1200 Nm, Euro III/Euro V

Transmissions
 ZF EcoLife 6AP1200C, 6-speed automatic
 Voith DIWA D854-6, 4-speed automatic
 6-speed synchromesh manual, with inbuilt hydrodynamic retarder

References

External links

Introduction Volvo Buses

Vehicles introduced in 2013
B8R
Bus chassis